The 2014 Kazakhstan Futsal Cup was the 19th staging of the Kazakhstan Futsal Cup.

Venues
Matches of a group stage took place in "Tulpar Sportcomplex". Other matches took place on "Baganashyl-Zenit Sportcomplex".

Group stage

Group A

Group B

Semi-final

Bronze medal match

Final

Top scorers

See also
2014-15 Kazakhstani Futsal Championship

References

Kazakhstan Futsal Cup
2014 in Kazakhstani football
Kazakhstani